The Lawrence Soule House is an historic house at 11 Russell Street in Cambridge, Massachusetts.  It is a -story brick building, with asymmetrical massing typical of the Queen Anne period.  Surface texture is varied by different types of brick patterning, and there are a variety of gables, projections, and irregularly placed chimneys.  It was built in 1879 for Lawrence Porter Soule to a design by Frank Maynard Howe, an apprentice at the firm of Ware & Van Brunt.  The building received immediate notice in the architectural press, and is a rare architect-designed house in North Cambridge.

The house was listed on the National Register of Historic Places in 1982.

See also
National Register of Historic Places listings in Cambridge, Massachusetts

References

Houses on the National Register of Historic Places in Cambridge, Massachusetts